David Best may refer to:
David Best (sculptor) (born 1945), American sculptor
David Best (footballer) (born 1943), English former professional footballer
David Best (politician) (1880–1949), politician in Manitoba, Canada